Congregation Temple Israel is a Reform synagogue in Creve Coeur, Missouri, USA, a municipality in suburban St. Louis County. Temple Israel's founders differed in opinion from the leadership of Shaare Emeth, favoring the more liberal political and theological view point that was sweeping parts of Europe and the United States at the time. One of these founders was Rabbi Solomon H. Sonneschein, who became Temple Israel's first rabbi. During the first year of operation (1886), Temple Israel had between 60 and 70 members and 604 persons attended the first Erev Rosh Hashanah services.

Rabbis 

Rabbis

1886-1890 Solomon H. Sonneschein
1890-1928 Leon Harrison
1929-1963 Ferdinand M. Isserman
1963-1967 Martin E. Katzenstein
1967-1987 Alvan D. Rubin
1987-2010 Mark L. Shook
2010-present Amy Feder

Associate and assistant rabbis
1958-1960 Arnold S. Task
1961-1963 Martin E. Katzenstein
1964-1966 Stanley J. Garfein
1966-1968 Richard F. Steinbrink
1968-1975 Alan D. Bregman

1972-1980 Mark L. Shook
1975-1978 Joseph P. Klein
1978-1983 Gary A. Huber
1980-1982 Martin L. Levy
1982-1987 Donald M. Kundstadt
1983-1985 Frank W. Muller
1985-1995 Eric J. Bram
1995-2000 Steven L. Mills
2000-2005 Amy B. Bigman
2003-2008 John A. Franken
2006-2010 Amy Feder
2008-present Michael Alper

Board presidents 
First President (1886) Isaac Schwab
Second President Moses Shoenberg
Third President William Stix
Fourth President Moses Fraley
Fifth President David Treichlinger
Sixth President Aaron Fuller
Seventh President David Sommers
1920-1930 Jules Glaser
1931-1937 Jesse A. Wolfort
1938-1940 Emil Mayer
1941-1942 Maurice Weil
1943-1945 Harry L. Franc
1946-1948 Adolph H. Rosenberg
1949-1950 Earl Susman
1951-1954 Harold W. Dubinsky
1955-1958 Melvin S. Strassner
1959-1961 Joseph Kutten
1962-1965 Edward A. Scallet
1966-1969 Marvin S. Levin
1970-1973 William B. Eiseman, Jr.
1974-1976 Robert S. Goldenhersh
1977-1979 Arthur E. Ansehl
1980-1983 Paul P. Weil
1984-1987 Merle L. Silverstein
1988-1990 Gary Follman
1990-1993 Ellen Deutsch
1994-1995 Leonard Adreon
1995-1998 Karen L. Knopf
1998-2000 Daniel J. Schwartz
2000-2003 Cary J. Mogerman
2004-2006 Neil J. Handelman
2006-2010 David L. Weinstein, M.D.
2011-2013 JoAnne Levy
2014-2017 Dee A. Mogerman
2018-2019 Robert D. Litz

2020-Present Louise Losos

Facilities 
The first Temple Israel building - a stone temple located off 28th and Pine Street - was completed in 1888. As Temple Israel's membership grew, the downtown location became inconvenient, and so a lot was purchased on Kingshighway and Washington Boulevards. 

In 1957, membership had grown to 1,358, and a larger facility was needed to accommodate. The cornerstone of a new Temple Israel building was laid on June 18, 1960, though only after a legal battle with the city when the congregation chose its new home. The synagogue was involved in litigation against the City of Creve Coeur when the City changed its zoning rules to prohibit any churches, including the synagogue, just after the synagogue purchased land for a new building. The Supreme Court of Missouri ruled that state law did not authorize municipalities to regulate the location of churches.

Public figures - members 
Benjamin Altheimer
Kurt Deutsch
Sam Fox 
Tom Gallop

Public figures - spoke at Temple Israel 
Abba Eben
Dr. Martin Luther King, Jr.
Henry Kissinger
Simon Wiesenthal

Other information 
The synagogue conducted its first wedding for an LGBT couple in 2008.

In 2010, Temple Israel made history by promoting assistant rabbi, Amy Feder, 31, to senior rabbi, making her the youngest female senior rabbi to lead a large Reform congregation in North America.

In 2018, the Temple had approximately 900 member households.

References

External links
home page
Golden Jubilee history of Temple Israel: 1886-1936: prepared in commemoration of the fiftieth anniversary of the founding of the temple: 5647-5697, Congregation Temple Israel (Creve Coeur, Mo.), 1937

Reform synagogues in Missouri
Religious organizations established in 1886
Religious buildings and structures in Missouri
1886 establishments in Missouri
Synagogues completed in 1888
Synagogues completed in 1962